Bukjeju County (Bukjeju-gun; "North Jeju County") was a county in Jeju Province, South Korea until July 1, 2006, when it was merged with Jeju City.

References

External links
County government website

Jeju Province
Jeju City
╋